Speidelia is a genus of moths of the family Noctuidae.

Species
 Speidelia apocrypha Ronkay, 2000
 Speidelia formosa Ronkay, 2000
 Speidelia taiwana  (Wileman, 1915)

References
 Natural History Museum Lepidoptera genus database

Cuculliinae